The Rookies, is a Chinese action film  written and directed by Alan Yuen, starring Wang Talu, Sandrine Pinna, Milla Jovovich, Xu Weizhou and Liu Meitong. Filming took place in Hungary and China. It was released in China on July 12, 2019.  The film was a box office failure during its release in China, grossing only around $3 million.

Synopsis
Extreme sport lover Zhao Feng gets involved in illegal international trade by accident. So he follows an international special agent Bruce to Budapest. Together with a crappy police officer Miao Yan, a non-professional scientist Ding Shan and an unemployed doctor LV, they form an amateur unit. In company with the senior agent Bruce, these four rookies start a fight with terrorists that is both thrilling and hilarious.

Cast
The following list and order are based on the billing shown on the first movie poster and IMDb.

Production

Filming
Filming locations are Hungary and China. In Hungary, the shooting spots include Hungarian State Opera House, Liberty Bridge, Gellért Hill, Váci Street and Liberty Square. The Rookies wrapped in China on January 23, 2018.

Release 
The Rookies was released in China on July 12, 2019.

On August 8, 2018, official site published two sets of posters.

References

External links
 
 

2019 films
Chinese action films
Eco-terrorism in fiction
English-language Chinese films